Ambiabe is a town and commune in Madagascar. It belongs to the district of Ifanadiana, which is a part of the region Vatovavy. The population of the commune was estimated 7,945 in 2018.

References and notes 

Populated places in Vatovavy